Tawngpeng (Loi Lung in Shan; Taungbaing in Burmese ) is a district in Burma. The capital of Tawngpeng is at Namhsan.

Tawngpeng is a center for tea production in the Shan States.

History
Tawngpeng State was a Palaung state in the Northern Shan States prior to the de-recognition of independent Shan States by the military government of Burma in 1962.

References

Geography of Shan State
Shan States